Craig is a city in the Prince of Wales-Hyder Census Area in the Unorganized Borough in the U.S. state of Alaska. The population was 1,036 at the 2020 census, down from 1,201 in 2010.

Geography
Craig is the largest town on Prince of Wales Island, the fourth-largest island in the United States.

Climate
Craig has an oceanic climate (Köppen Cfb). Summers are mild with cool nights, while winters are chilly and wet. Precipitation is abundant year-round but is heaviest in autumn.

History
Originally, Craig's townsite was a temporary fishing camp used for gathering herring.

Name
Craig was named after Craig Miller (also spelled Millar) who established a fish saltery on nearby Fish Egg Island in 1907 with the assistance of the local Haida natives who moved onto Prince of Wales Island, being driven from Haida Gwaii (British Columbia's Queen Charlotte Islands) starting in the 18th century. Craig Miller constructed a cold storage plant and packing company at the present site of Craig, and in 1922 was instrumental in the incorporation of the city (originally as an Alaska second-class city within the Alaska Territory, pre-statehood).

Growth
The commercial fishing industry was responsible for Craig's relatively large population compared to neighboring communities. In the 1930s, record pink salmon runs brought many new settlers. The 1950s saw a collapse of the fishing industry because of depleted salmon populations. In 1972, a large sawmill was established nearby providing a steady source of year-round employment. Today, Craig relies on commercial fishing, fish processing, and the timber industry.

1982 deaths
On September 7, 1982, the fishing boat Investor was found burning off the coast of Craig, and the boat's passengers and crew were found to have been killed. Due to the badly burned state of the bodies, investigators were only certain that they had recovered the remains of seven bodies, but a coroner's jury ruled that all eight who were aboard the boat had been killed. The boat's owner, Mark Coulthurst, from Blaine, Washington, his wife Irene, and their two young children were among the victims. In September 1984, a suspect, John Kenneth Peel, from Bellingham, Washington, was arrested for the murders. Peel's first trial ended in a hung jury, and his retrial, in 1988, ended in his acquittal.

2013 earthquake

On January 5, 2013, at 3:58 am ET Craig was hit by a 7.5-magnitude offshore earthquake 63 miles (102 km) west of the town. Regional tsunami warnings and advisories were issued. Voluntary evacuations of the town occurred. Despite this, no fatalities, serious injuries, or incidents of damage were reported and the tsunami threat never materialized other than minor, localized sea level rises.

Demographics

Craig first appeared on the 1920 U.S. Census as an unincorporated village. It incorporated in 1922.

Craig's demographic characteristics have varied following trends in the commercial fishing industry, from 1980 through 2000 Craig's population more than doubled.

As of the census of 2000, there were 1,397 people, 523 households, and 348 families residing in the city. The racial makeup of the city was 67.07% White, 0.07% Black or African American, 21.69% Native American, 0.57% Asian, 0.57% from other races, and 10.02% from two or more races. 2.79% of the population were Hispanic or Latino of any race.

There were 523 households, out of which 41.1% had children under the age of 18 living with them, 49.9% were married couples living together, 11.5% had a female householder with no husband present, and 33.3% were non-families. 25.2% of all households were made up of individuals, and 3.8% had someone living alone who was 65 years of age or older. The average household size was 2.63 and the average family size was 3.16.

In the city, the age distribution of the population shows 31.9% under the age of 18, 7.9% from 18 to 24, 31.8% from 25 to 44, 23.9% from 45 to 64, and 4.6% who were 65 years of age or older. The median age was 34 years. For every 100 females, there were 119.7 males. For every 100 females age 18 and over, there were 118.3 males.

The median income for a household in the city was $45,298, and the median income for a family was $52,500. Males had a median income of $41,111 versus $23,558 for females. The per capita income for the city was $20,176. About 7.8% of families and 9.8% of the population were below the poverty line, including 13.4% of those under age 18 and none of those age 65 or over.

Transportation
Craig, the island's largest population center and administrative hub for many island companies and organizations, actually has limited-direct transportation off of Prince of Wales Island.

Seaplane base
Transportation is primarily via floatplane charters at Craig Seaplane Base. Klawock Airport can accommodate wheeled-aircraft and is a short drive away.

Ferry
Inter-Island Ferry Authority provides regularly scheduled year-round ferry service between Ketchikan and Hollis located on the Eastern coast of Prince of Wales island. The Inter-Island Ferry Authority's central offices are located in Klawock. The ferry terminal is located an hour drive outside of Craig and the ferry takes 3 hours to get to Ketchikan, Alaska.

There are a few marine shipping companies providing scheduled cargo barge service to South-Eastern, Alaska. Craig is usually one of their ports-of-call, handling inter-modal shipping containers for deliveries to other communities.

Shuttle
Prince of Wales Transportation based in Craig, provides island-wide shuttle services from the ferry terminals to the other communities and island attractions.

Economy
Commercial fishing and related support business comprises the largest portion of Craig's economy. This is supplemented by timber industry related activities like the sawmill, and many residents use subsistence resources in addition to the formal economy.

In 2000, Craig had 42 vessel owners with operations in federal fisheries, 84 vessel owners with operations in state fisheries, and 149 registered crew members; 199 residents held 437 commercial fishing permits; 3,405 sport fishing licenses were sold, 2,590 licenses to non-residents of Alaska.

Commercial fishing generates much of the income in Craig. There are two harbors in the center of town one which primarily contains smaller charter and recreational boats, and the North Cove Harbor where the trollers, seiners, longliners, shrimp, crab, and dive boats that make up the local fleet are moored. During the peak of the fishing season in summer, the harbor is usually so full that boats must anchor out in the bay.

Tourism provides jobs and income to the community. Many charter fishing lodges cater to guests who visit the island for the salmon fishing as well as black bear and deer hunting.

The other main employer in Craig is the U.S. Forest Service. The rest of the economy is mainly supportive. There is a city-run medical clinic, a few restaurants, a general store, two banks, a grocery store, a coffeeshop/bookstore, clothing store, gift store, nursery and outdoor outfitter.

Schools
Craig has an elementary, middle, high school and an alternative school with 35 teachers and about 860 students.

Utilities
City of Craig provides piped water from the North Fork Lake reservoir, as well as providing a public sewage system.

Alaska Power & Telephone (an employee owned company) provides hydro-electric power, telephone, and internet service to much of southeastern Alaska, including Craig. There are a few cellular carriers providing service on Prince of Wales Island, mostly to the more densely populated communities like Craig.

Notable people
Holly Madison (Hefner) (born 1979), model, television personality; one of the stars of the E! channel's The Girls Next Door

Notes

Further reading

References

External links
 City of Craig website
 Craig Tribal Association

Cities in Alaska
Cities in Prince of Wales–Hyder Census Area, Alaska
Populated coastal places in Alaska on the Pacific Ocean